Explainable AI (XAI), or Interpretable AI, or Explainable Machine Learning (XML), is artificial intelligence (AI) in which humans can understand the decisions or predictions made by the AI. It contrasts with the "black box" concept in machine learning where even its designers cannot explain why an AI arrived at a specific decision. By refining the mental models of users of AI-powered systems and dismantling their misconceptions, XAI promises to help users perform more effectively. XAI may be an implementation of the social right to explanation.  XAI is relevant even if there is no legal right or regulatory requirement. For example, XAI can improve the user experience of a product or service by helping end users trust that the AI is making good decisions. This way the aim of XAI is to explain what has been done, what is done right now, what will be done next and unveil the information the actions are based on. These characteristics make it possible (i) to confirm existing knowledge (ii) to challenge existing knowledge and (iii) to generate new assumptions.

The algorithms used in AI can be differentiated into white-box and black-box machine learning (ML) algorithms. White-box models are ML models that provide results that are understandable for experts in the domain. Black-box models, on the other hand, are extremely hard to explain and can hardly be understood even by domain experts. XAI algorithms are considered to follow the three principles of transparency, interpretability and explainability. Transparency is given “if the processes that extract model parameters from training data and generate labels from testing data can be described and motivated by the approach designer”. Interpretability describes the possibility of comprehending the ML model and presenting the underlying basis for decision-making in a way that is understandable to humans. Explainability is a concept that is recognized as important, but a joint definition is not yet available. It is suggested that explainability in ML can be considered as “the collection of features of the interpretable domain, that have contributed for a given example to produce a decision (e.g., classification or regression)”. If algorithms meet these requirements, they provide a basis for justifying decisions, tracking and thereby verifying them, improving the algorithms, and exploring new facts.

Sometimes it is also possible to achieve a result with high accuracy with a white-box ML algorithm that is interpretable in itself. This is especially important in domains like medicine, defense, finance and law, where it is crucial to understand the decisions and build up trust in the algorithms. Many researchers argue that, at least for supervised machine learning, the way forward is symbolic regression, where the algorithm searches the space of mathematical expressions to find the model that best fits a given dataset.

AI systems optimize behavior to satisfy a mathematically specified goal system chosen by the system designers, such as the command "maximize accuracy of assessing how positive film reviews are in the test dataset". The AI may learn useful general rules from the test set, such as "reviews containing the word 'horrible' are likely to be negative". However, it may also learn inappropriate rules, such as "reviews containing 'Daniel Day-Lewis' are usually positive"; such rules may be undesirable if they are deemed likely to fail to generalize outside the train set, or if people consider the rule to be "cheating" or "unfair". A human can audit rules in an XAI to get an idea how likely the system is to generalize to future real-world data outside the test-set.

Goals 
Cooperation between agents, in this case algorithms and humans, depends on trust. If humans are to accept algorithmic prescriptions, they need to trust them. Incompleteness in formalization of trust criteria is a barrier to straightforward optimization approaches. For that reason, transparency, interpretability and explainability are posited as intermediate goals for checking other criteria. This is particularly relevant in medicine, especially clinical decision support systems (CDSS), where medical professionals should be able to understand how and why a machine-based decision has been made in order to trust the decision and augment their decision-making process.

AI systems sometimes learn undesirable tricks that do an optimal job of satisfying explicit pre-programmed goals on the training data, but that do not reflect the complicated implicit desires of the human system designers. For example, a 2017 system tasked with image recognition learned to "cheat" by looking for a copyright tag that happened to be associated with horse pictures, rather than learning how to tell if a horse was actually pictured. In another 2017 system, a supervised learning AI tasked with grasping items in a virtual world learned to cheat by placing its manipulator between the object and the viewer in a way such that it falsely appeared to be grasping the object.

One transparency project, the DARPA XAI program, aims to produce "glass box" models that are explainable to a "human-in-the-loop", without greatly sacrificing AI performance. Human users should be able to understand the AI's cognition (both in real-time and after the fact), and should be able to determine when to trust the AI and when the AI should be distrusted. Other applications of XAI are knowledge extraction from black-box models and model comparisons. The term "glass box" has also been used for tools that monitor the inputs and outputs of a system, with the purpose of verifying the system's adherence to ethical and socio-legal values and, therefore, producing value-based explanations. Furthermore, the same term has been used to name a voice assistant that produces counterfactual statements as explanations.

History and methods 

During the 1970s to 1990s, symbolic reasoning systems, such as MYCIN, GUIDON, SOPHIE, and PROTOS were explored that could represent, reason about, and explain their reasoning for diagnostic, instructional, or machine-learning (explanation-based learning) purposes. MYCIN, developed in the early 1970s as a research prototype for diagnosing bacteremia infections of the bloodstream, could explain which of its hand-coded rules contributed to a diagnosis in a specific case. Research in intelligent tutoring systems resulted in developing systems such as SOPHIE that could act as an 'articulate expert', explaining problem-solving strategy at a level the student could understand, so they would know what action to take next. For instance, SOPHIE could explain the qualitative reasoning behind its electronics troubleshooting, even though it ultimately relied on the SPICE circuit simulator. Similarly, GUIDON added tutorial rules to supplement MYCIN's domain-level rules so it could explain strategy for medical diagnosis. Symbolic approaches to machine learning, especially those relying on explanation-based learning, such as PROTOS, explicitly relied on representations of explanations, both to explain their actions and to acquire new knowledge.

In the 1980s through early 1990s, truth maintenance systems (TMS) were developed to extend the capabilities of causal-reasoning, rule-based, and logic-based inference systems. A TMS acts to explicitly track alternate lines of reasoning, justifications for conclusions, and lines of reasoning that lead to contradictions, allowing future reasoning to avoid these dead ends. To provide explanation, they trace reasoning from conclusions to assumptions through rule operations or logical inferences, allowing explanations to be generated from the reasoning traces.  As an example, consider a rule-based problem solver with just a few rules about Socrates that concludes he has died from poison:

By the 1990s researchers also began studying whether it is possible to meaningfully extract the non-hand-coded rules being generated by opaque trained neural networks. Researchers in clinical expert systems creating neural network-powered decision support for clinicians have sought to develop dynamic explanations that allow these technologies to be more trusted and trustworthy in practice. In the 2010s public concerns about racial and other bias in the use of AI for criminal sentencing decisions and findings of creditworthiness may have led to increased demand for transparent artificial intelligence. As a result, many academics and organizations are developing tools to help detect bias in their systems.

Marvin Minsky et al. raised the issue that AI can function as a form of surveillance, with the biases inherent in surveillance, suggesting HI (Humanistic Intelligence) as a way to create a more fair and balanced "human-in-the-loop" AI.

Modern complex AI techniques, such as deep learning and genetic algorithms are naturally opaque. To address this issue, there has been a development of many new methods to make new models more explainable and interpretable. This includes many methods, such as Layerwise relevance propagation (LRP), a technique for determining which features in a particular input vector contribute most strongly to a neural network's output.  Other techniques have been developed to explain one particular prediction made by a (nonlinear) black-box model, a goal referred to as "local interpretability". It is worth noting that the mere transposition of the concepts of local interpretability into a remote context (where the black-box model is executed at a third party) is currently under scrutiny.

In addition, there has been work on making glass-box models which are more transparent to inspection. This includes decision trees, Bayesian networks, sparse linear models, and more. The Association for Computing Machinery Conference on Fairness, Accountability, and Transparency (ACM FAccT) was established in 2018 to study transparency and explainability in the context of socio-technical systems, many of which include artificial intelligence.

Some techniques allow visualisations of the inputs which individual software neurons respond to most strongly. Several groups have found that neurons can be aggregated into circuits which perform human-comprehensible functions, some of which reliably arise across different networks trained independently.

At a higher level, various techniques exist to extract compressed representations of the features of given inputs, which can then be analysed by standard clustering techniques. Alternatively, networks can be trained to output linguistic explanations of their behaviour, which are then directly human-interpretable. Model behaviour can also be explained with reference to training data—for example, by evaluating which training inputs influenced a given behaviour the most.

Regulation 

As regulators, official bodies, and general users come to depend on AI-based dynamic systems, clearer accountability will be required for automated decision-making processes to ensure trust and transparency. Evidence of this requirement gaining more momentum can be seen with the launch of the first global conference exclusively dedicated to this emerging discipline, the International Joint Conference on Artificial Intelligence: Workshop on Explainable Artificial Intelligence (XAI).

The European Union introduced a right to explanation in the General Data Protection Right (GDPR) as an attempt to deal with the potential problems stemming from the rising importance of algorithms. The implementation of the regulation began in 2018. However, the right to explanation in GDPR covers only the local aspect of interpretability. In the United States, insurance companies are required to be able to explain their rate and coverage decisions. In France the Loi pour une République numérique (Digital Republic Act) grants subjects the right to request and receive information pertaining to the implementation of algorithms which process data about them.

Limitations 
Despite efforts to increase the explainability of AI models, they still have a number of limitations.

Adversarial parties  
By making an AI system more explainable, we also reveal more of its inner workings. For example, the explainability method of feature importance identifies features or variables that are most important in determining the model's output, while the influential samples method identifies the training samples that are most influential in determining the output, given a particular input. However, there are a number of adversarial parties that could take advantage of this knowledge.

For example, competitor firms could replicate aspects of the original AI system in their own product, thus reducing competitive advantage. An explainable AI system is also susceptible to different parties to “game” the system, or influence the output in a way that undermines the intended purpose. One study gives the example of a predictive policing system; in this case, those who could potentially “game” the system are the criminals subject to the system's decisions. In this study, developers of the system discussed the issue of criminal gangs looking to illegally obtain passports, and they expressed concerns that, if given an idea of what factors might trigger an alert in the passport application process, those gangs would be able to “send guinea pigs” to test those triggers, eventually finding a loophole that would allow them to “reliably get passports from under the noses of the authorities”.

Technical complexity 
A fundamental barrier to making AI systems explainable in the first place is the technical complexity of such systems. End users often lack even the prerequisite coding knowledge required to understand software of any kind. Current methods used to explain AI are mainly technical ones, geared toward machine learning engineers for debugging purposes, rather than the end users who are ultimately affected by the system, causing “a gap between explainability in practice and the goal of transparency”. Proposed solutions to address the issue of technical complexity include either promoting the coding education of the general public that would make technical explanations more accessible to end users, or developing an outward-facing component that would provide explanations in layperson terms.

Regardless of the solution, however, it must avoid the pitfall of oversimplification. It is important to strike a balance between accuracy – how faithfully does the explanation reflect the actual process of the AI system – and explainability – how well end users understand the process. However, this is a difficult balance to strike, since complexity of machine learning makes it difficult for even ML engineers to fully understand, let alone non-experts.

Understanding versus trust 
The goal of explainability to end users of AI systems is ultimately to increase trust in the system, even “address concerns about lack of ‘fairness’ and discriminatory effects”. However, even with a good understanding of an AI system, end users may not necessarily trust the system. In one study, participants were presented with combinations of white-box and black-box explanations, and static and interactive explanations of AI systems. While these explanations served to increase both their self-reported and objective understanding, it had no impact on their level of trust, which remained skeptical.

This outcome was especially true for decisions which impacted the end user in a significant way, such as graduate school admissions. Participants judged algorithms to be too inflexible and unforgiving in comparison to human decision-makers; instead of rigidly adhering to a set of rules, humans are able to consider exceptional cases as well as appeals to their initial decision. So for such decisions, explainability will not necessarily cause end users to accept the use of decision-making algorithms. We will need to either turn to another method to increase trust and acceptance of decision-making algorithms, or question the need to rely solely on AI for such impactful decisions in the first place.

Criticism 
Recent scholarship has suggested that the pursuit of explainability in AI techniques should be considered a secondary goal to the pursuit of AI's effectiveness, and that encouraging the exclusive development of XAI may limit the functionality of AI more broadly. Critiques of XAI rely on developed concepts of mechanistic and empiric reasoning from evidence-based medicine to suggest that AI technologies can be clinically validated even when their function cannot be understood by their operators.

Moreover, XAI systems have primarily focused on making AI systems understandable to AI practitioners rather than end users, and their results on user perceptions of these systems have been somewhat fragmented. Some researchers have also advocated for the use of inherently interpretable machine learning models, rather than using post-hoc explanations, where a second model is created to explain the first. This is partly because post-hoc models increase the complexity in a decision pathway and partly because it is often unclear how faithfully a post-hoc explanation can mimic the computations of an entirely separate model. However, another popular view is that it only matters if the explanation accomplishes the given task at hand, and whether it is pre or post-hoc, doesn't matter. For example, if a post-hoc explanation method helps a doctor diagnose cancer better, it is of secondary importance whether it is a correct/incorrect explanation.

Analysis of the goals of XAI find that it requires a form of lossy compression that will become less effective as AI models grow in their number of parameters, and in conjunction with other factors this leads to a theoretical limit for explainability.

See also 

 Accumulated local effects

References

External links 
 
  
  
  
 
 
 
 
 
 
 
 
 
 
 
 

Self-driving cars
Accountability
Management cybernetics